Thomas Goddard may refer to:

 Thomas Goddard (MP for Wiltshire), member of parliament for Wiltshire in 1767
Thomas Goddard (MP) (1777–1814), member of parliament for Cricklade
 Thomas Goddard (priest) (1674–1731), Canon of Windsor
 Thomas Goddard (jurist) (1937–2019), New Zealand jurist

See also 
 Goddard family of Wiltshire, Hampshire and Berkshire, England